Head IV, sometimes subtitled Man with a Monkey, is a 1949 painting by Irish-born British artist Francis Bacon, one of series of works made in 1949 for his first one-man exhibition at the Hanover Gallery, in London.  It measures  and is held in a private collection.

The painting is part of a series of six works from the late 1940s depicting heads.  Like Head III and Head V, Head IV is usually considered as an intermediate steps towards his Head VI (and Head IV is sometimes confused with the better known Head VI).  The work depicts the upper half of a male figure in a suit, in a rear quarter view facing away from the viewer, in a space shrouded with vertical bands interpreted as curtains.  The figure is possibly looking in a mirror, where a simian face looks back.  Like Head III, it is painted in dark tones of grey and black on a beige ground with white highlights, which in this case pick out the man's shirt collar, his neck, ear and temple.  The placing of the two heads suggest the man is dissolving into the monkey, although the man is sometimes described as having a monkey on his shoulder; the low contrast between the elements have been likened to a cinematic dissolve.  It may be based on a photograph.

Bacon's six Head paintings were first exhibited at the Hanover Gallery in 1949, alongside four other important early works by Bacon: Three Studies for Figures at the Base of a Crucifixion, Figure in a landscape, Study from the Human Body and Study for Portrait (also known as  Man in a Blue Box).  Many are now held by major public collections.

Head IV was bought in 1949 by Tony Hubbard, heir to a fortune from the Woolworth business.  It entered the private collection of the New York broker Geoffrey Gates in 1963.  It remains in a private collection.

A 1961 self-portrait of Bacon is also known as Head IV.

References

External links
 Head IV (Man with a Monkey) (1949), francis-bacon.com
 Head IV (Man with a Monkey), 1949, Artimage
 Head IV (1961), francis-bacon.com
 Wyndham Lewis and Francis Bacon, Jan Cox
  About Modern Art, David Sylvester, p. 175
 The Gilded Gutter Life Of Francis Bacon: The Authorized Biography, Daniel Farson, p. 74

1949 paintings
Paintings by Francis Bacon